Russell Hutchison (born July 6, 1978) is a defender who played for American USL First Division side Virginia Beach Mariners from 2002 until their demise in 2006.

Hutchison was born  in Lynchburg, Virginia and attended the University of Maine, playing on the men's soccer team from 1996 to 2000.  In 1998, he played for the Sioux City Breeze during the collegiate off-season.  In 1999, he similarly played for the Vermont Voltage.  In 2000, he saw limited time with the Minnesota Thunder.  In 2001, he played seven games for the Connecticut Wolves of the USL A-League.  In 2002, Hutchinson moved to the Virginia Beach Mariners.  He made 20 appearances for the Mariners in the 2005 season and scored one goal. The following campaign he played only 12 games before the Mariners were disbanded at the end of the season.

He graduated from the University of Maine in 2000.

References
General

Specific

American soccer players
Connecticut Wolves players
Maine Black Bears men's soccer players
Minnesota Thunder players
Sioux City Breeze players
Vermont Voltage players
Virginia Beach Mariners players
USL First Division players
USISL players
A-League (1995–2004) players
Association football defenders
1978 births
Living people
Soccer players from Virginia
Sportspeople from Lynchburg, Virginia